The House of Bokassa is an African former ruling imperial dynasty. Its founder, Jean-Bédel Bokassa, ruled as self-crowned emperor over the territories of the Central African Empire from 4 December 1976 until 21 September 1979, when he was overthrown. His claim to an imperial title had little recognition in the international community.

Establishment and ruling history 

The foundation of the House of Bokassa began in March 1972, when Jean-Bédel Bokassa proclaimed himself marshal and president-for-life of the Central African Republic. Public dissent continually grew over the next few years, surviving a coup attempt in December 1974, and narrowly escaped assassination in February 1976. International support was waning during this period as well, so in response Bokassa dissolved the republican government and established the Central African Revolutionary Council in September 1976.

On 4 December 1976, Bokassa instituted a new constitution, naming himself Emperor of the Central African Empire and his son, Jean-Bédel Bokassa II, was declared crown prince and heir to the throne. The emperor's sixth wife—Bokassa maintained a harem of 19 women despite converting to Catholicism. His wife Catherine Denguiadé, became the Empress of Central Africa.

The ruling house was deposed along with Emperor Bokassa I when he was succeeded as head of state by David Dacko as President of the Central African Republic in 1979. Bokassa continued to consider himself the head of state in exile. Jean-Bédel Bokassa II is the current pretender to the Imperial Throne of Central Africa and the current head of the Imperial Family.

The Emperor was sentenced to death for murder in absentia. He later served a jail sentence in his home country, was pardoned and died of natural causes in 1996.

Neither the United States nor any European country acknowledged or supported the newly founded monarchy, with the exception of France, whose president, Valéry Giscard d'Estaing, held close ties to Bokassa. By 1979, France had withdrawn its support as well. Pope Paul VI refused to take part in the coronation ceremony.

Ancestry 

The remotest known ancestor of the Imperial House was Dobogon Gbo Hosegoton Bokassa, a person possibly living in the 17th century. The Emperor Bokassa himself was the son of Mindogon Mbougdoulou, a tribal nobleman who reigned over their birthplace and who was married to Marie Yokowo. Further distant relatives most probably exist from the side of Bokassa's uncles, the other sons of his grandfather Mbalanga, who, excluding his father, totaled a grand number of 31.

Descent 

Bokassa I had 40 children by his 19 wives. Among these are:

 Georges Bokassa, 24 December 1949. Among others, he is the father of Romuald Bokassa and Estelle-Marguerite Bokassa.
 Martine Bokassa, born 2 February 1953. She herself is the mother of six children, amongst which are Jean-Barthélémy Dédéavode-Bokassa and Marie Catherine Yokowo Dédéavode-Bokassa
 Jean Charles Bokassa
 Saint Cyr Bokassa
 Nicole Bokassa
 Marie Alyce Bokassa
 Saint Sylvestre Bokassa
 Jean Parfait Bokassa
 Marie Ange Bokassa
 Jean Le Grand Bokassa
 Charlemagne Bokassa
 Jean-Serge Bokassa
 Jean-Bédel Bokassa II, the Heir Apparent
 Kiki Bokassa, an artist
 Lucienne Bokassa-Barbier-Mueller
 Marguerite Bokassa

Bokassa also adopted several children, three of which were Africans. One of these, however, was born in Vietnam as Martine Nguyễn Thị Bái and became Martine Bokassa upon her adoption.

Other relatives bearing imperial titles 

 Catherine Bagalama, sister of Bokassa I
 Constantin Mbalanga, cousin of Bokassa I
 Elisabeth Kpomanzia, aunt of Bokassa I

References

 
Bokassa
self-proclaimed monarchy